Firefly Festival may refer to:

 Firefly Music Festival, annual music festival held at the Dover International Speedway in Dover, Delaware, United States
 Fireflies Festival of Sacred Music, annual music festival held at the Fireflies Ashram in Bangalore, India
 Firefly Arts Collective, non-profit organization that facilitates the annual New England regional burner festival 'Firefly'
 Muju Firefly Festival, Korea's annual representative environmental festival held on the theme of Firefly, Natural Treasure No. 322

See also
 Firefly (disambiguation)